Aarnoud Jan Anne Aleid, Baron van Heemstra (22 July 1871 – 30 December 1957) was a Dutch nobleman, jurist and politician. He served as mayor of Arnhem between 1910 and 1920, and Governor-General of Suriname from 1921 until 1928. Van Heemstra was the grandfather of Audrey Hepburn.

Life and career

He was a member of the Van Heemstra family and was born in Vreeland, the son of Wilhelmina Cornelia (née de Beaufort, 1843–1927) and Willem Hendrik Johan Baron van Heemstra (1841–1909), the mayor of Loenen. He studied at Utrecht University where he obtained his doctorate in law in 1896.

Van Heemstra established himself in Arnhem where he was prosecuting lawyer. In 1902 he was appointed official at the district court in Roermond and in October 1909 deputy public prosecutor at the arrondissement court of Maastricht. In 1910 he became mayor of the city of Arnhem. He resigned in 1920 after a budget dispute, and was succeeded by Dirk Jan de Geer.

In 1921, van Heemstra was appointed governor of Suriname by Queen Wilhelmina. He started to focus on the economy of the colony, and develop the potential of the bauxite reserves. In 1922, Alcoa opened the first bauxite factory in Moengo. He tried to attract German mining companies, but was blocked by the States General of the Netherlands. In May 1924, he applied for a short leave, but did not return until 23 January 1925. He was reinstalled on 21 February 1925. There were several conflicts with the Estates of Suriname who called for his resignation. In 1928, he resigned as governor after a conflict with the States General.

Van Heemstra returned to the Arnhem region, and became editor-in-chief of Politiek Economisch Weekblad, a political economic magazine published until 1940. He was originally pro-German and pro-Japan, however during the late 1930s, he started to change his mind.

Van Heemstra refused to collaborate with the NSB during World War II. In 1942, the German occupiers confiscated most of his possessions, including his estate . He moved to Oosterbeek and later Velp. On 15 August 1942, his son-in-law Otto graaf van Limburg Stirum was executed in retaliation for a sabotage by the resistance movement. After this, his widowed daughter Miesje (1897–1987) and his divorced daughter Ella (1900–1984) lived with him in Velp, along with Ella's youngest child, the future actress Audrey Hepburn (1929–1993).

Van Heemstra died in Oosterbeek on 30 December 1957, at the age of 86.

Family
In 1896, he married Elbrig Willemine Henriette Baroness van Asbeck (1873–1939), who was a granddaughter of Dirk van Hogendorp. They had six children:

 Wilhelmina Cornelia (Miesje) Baroness van Heemstra (1897–1987), married to Otto Graaf van Limburg Stirum (1893–1942)
 Geraldine Caroline Baroness van Heemstra (1898–1965)
 Ella Baroness van Heemstra (1900–1984), mother of actress Audrey Hepburn
 Marianne Jacqueline Baroness van Heemstra (1903–1991), lady-in-waiting to Princess and later Queen Juliana of the Netherlands
 Willem Hendrik Johan Baron van Heemstra (1907–1978)
 Arnoudina Johanna Baroness van Heemstra (1911–1975)

In 1947, eight years after the death of his first wife, Van Heemstra married a second time, to Anna Eliza Roosenburg (1901–1988). They remained married until his death in 1957.

Honours
 Knight of the Order of the Netherlands Lion
 Commander of the Order of Orange-Nassau
 Grand Officer of the Order of the House of Orange

References

HEEMSTRA, Aarnoud Jan Anne Aleid baron van (1871–1957) at historici.nl. (in Dutch)

1871 births
1957 deaths
Aarnoud
Aarnoud
Commanders of the Order of Orange-Nassau
Dutch jurists
Governors of Suriname
Knights of the Order of Saint John in the Netherlands
Knights of the Order of the Netherlands Lion
Mayors of Arnhem
People from Loenen
Utrecht University alumni